Quincy is a 2018 American documentary film about the life of American record producer, singer and film producer Quincy Jones. The film was co-written and co-directed by Alan Hicks and Rashida Jones and produced by Paula DuPré Pesmen.  The film was released by Netflix on September 21, 2018.

The film won a Grammy Award for Best Music Film at the 2019 Grammy Awards.

Production

The documentary is co-directed by Jones' daughter Rashida Jones and Alan Hicks. It was produced by Paula DuPré Pesmen, and executive produced by Jane Rosenthal and Berry Welsh for TriBeCa Productions and Adam Fell for Quincy Jones Productions. On August 1, 2018, it was announced that Netflix had acquired the documentary film about Quincy Jones.

Epilogue
The film epilogue details his career as follows: "Over 2,900 songs recorded; over 300 albums recorded; 51 film and television scores; over 1,000 original compositions; 79 Grammy nominations; 27 Grammy awards; 1 of 18 EGOT winners (Emmy, Grammy, Oscar, Tony); Thriller the best selling album of all time; We Are the World the best selling single of all time; $63 million raised for famine relief in Africa; and 7 children."

Release
The film had a special screening on September 9, 2018 at the 2018 Toronto International Film Festival, at the Princess of Wales Theatre in Toronto, Canada.

Quincy was released on September 21, 2018 on Netflix.

Awards

See also
 List of black films of the 2010s

References

External links
 
 

2018 films
2018 documentary films
Netflix original documentary films
American documentary films
African-American films
Documentary films about music and musicians
Documentary films about African Americans
Grammy Award for Best Long Form Music Video
2010s English-language films
2010s American films
English-language documentary films